RVNG Intl. is an independent record label based in Brooklyn, New York. Founded in 2003 by Matt Werth, the label is run by Werth and focuses on experimental dance and electronic music, often incorporating avant-garde genres. Release formats include vinyl, CDs, and digital downloads. In 2011, they were named one of the top 50 indie labels in America by Billboard.

In its nascent years, the label released the mix tape series RVNG PRSNTS MX, which was later followed by the Rvng of the Nrds 12" edit series. The ReRVNG archival series and FRKWYS series continue to this day, the latter of which pairs contemporary artists with influential musical pioneers. RVNG Intl. has also released original albums by artists such as Blondes, The Body, Holly Herndon, Julia Holter, Maxmillion Dunbar, and Stellar OM Source. In 2011, the label began releasing vinyl singles under the Beats in Space imprint, which Werth co-owns with Tim Sweeney.

RVNG Intl. was chosen as Resident Advisor's label of the month in January 2014 and Tiny Mix Tapes included RVNG Intl. amongst their favorite labels of 2015.

In 2016 Gideon Coe hosted “Label of Love is RVNG Records” on BBC Radio 6 and The Vinyl Factory featured RVNG as one of the top “20 Record Labels to Follow on Instagram”. The same year Apple Music Experimental Spotlight was on RVNG Intl.

In 2017 RVNG Intl. was listed as one of the best things/happenings of 2017 by The Ransom Note. The label also participated in the Prelude to Sleep series at Moogfest. An LGBTQ benefit compilation entitled “Peaceful Protest” was produced by RVNG Intl. in 2017, while in the same year RVNG pledged all profits from Bandcamp to benefit the ACLU.

The label is also noted for its charitable program Come Mend, in which a portion of record sale profits are donated to causes chosen by the label's artists.

History

Background and founding
The record label RVNG Intl. was launched in 2003 by Matt Werth. Werth was born in Madison, Wisconsin and spent his formative years in Little Rock, Arkansas. When he was 15, he started the punk 'zine Potluck and took over the record label File Thirteen. First established as what Werth called a "self-reflective journal fanzine" in 1989, File Thirteen was operated by Werth for 8 years.

In 1996, Werth moved to Philadelphia at the age of 18 to play bass for Aspera Ad Astra. While attending Temple University he met Dave Pianka, and together they came up with the idea of RVNG Intl., which was originally an event production company. A mutual friend, Michael Zwizanski, recommended the name, which is an anti-voweled version of "revenge", much in the style of Primal Scream's XTRMNTR, which had come out around the same time.

Werth said that the label's very first mix was intended for event clients, as proof that the label could select and manage good DJs. According to Werth, "Julian Grefe put together the first RVNG mix ―RVNG PRSNTS MX1, which was basically a spray-painted CD in a spray-painted case." Following the initial mix release, MX CDs became an infrequent series of albums from artists such as Tim Sweeney and DJ Twitch. After six years in Philadelphia, Werth moved to Brooklyn in 2002 in order to work at Flyer magazine.

First releases
The record label RVNG Intl was launched in 2003 by Werth. The label is based in its original location of Brooklyn, New York, Packaging is frequently detailed and unique. For example, a 7" vinyl from Purple Brain came with a hand-crocheted case by designer Dani Griffiths and 1000 prints of Pink Skull's Endless Bummer were letter-pressed with 1000 different variations on the album title phrase.

By 2010, the label had put out two original releases: These Are Powers’ Candyman EP and Pink Skull’s Endless Bummer LP. In 2011, they put out albums by Mirror Mirror and Bronze and were named one of the top 50 indie labels in America by Billboard. In 2012, the label released Blondes by  Blondes, which Sean Adams, the founder of Drowned in Sound, lauded with a 10/10 review, praising the music as "bliss" and his "eureka moment."

Other notable albums in 2012 included    Ekstasis by  Julia Holter, which was named Pitchfork's Best New Music and described as "music that's both haunting and life-affirming, something to make you dream and think", in addition to the critically acclaimed "Movement" by experimental composer Holly Herndon.

In 2013, the label released Swisher by Blondes, and notable albums from Maximillion Dunbar, Blondes, Gardland, and Holly Herndon. As of 2014, RVNG has also released a number of singles and albums from the likes of Bing & Ruth and others. Preserving past works from pioneering musicians is another focus, as exemplified by the release of a double LP set from artist and producer Craig Leon (Nommos and Visiting), titled Anthology of Interplanerary Folk Music Vol. 1 and K. Leimer's A Period of Review.

Series
Rvng presents Mx series
In 2003 the label first released the Rvng presents Mx CD & vinyl series, which included works from artists such as Tim Sweeney, Justine D and Purple Brain.

RVNG of the NRDS series
Starting in 2006 the label began releasing a vinyl series of disco edits, titled RVNG of the NRDS. The series ran for four years with album artwork from Kevin O’Neill of the independent design firm Will Work For Good. According to a review, the series was "carefully riding the edges of the nu-disco zeitgeist thanks to two obvious factors...the caliber of the artists involved, and the quality of presentation from Will Work For Good, a design agency that has helped form the visual identity of the label across its many releases".

Ten Rvng of The Nrds albums were released, including works by Todd Terje, Greg Wilson, and Pilooski. Each artist also contributed to re-edits of songs by artists such as Wire and R.D. Burman.

FRKWYS series

In 2009, RVNG initiated the FRKWYS series, skipping Volume 1 by initially releasing Frkwys Vol. 2. The first edition featured two remixes of the experimental band Excepter, remixed by Carter Tutti and JG Thirlwell and was praised as "evidence of what can make New York music great when its proprietors are willing to sacrifice expectation for innovation." The series title references Moses Asch's label Folkways.

In May 2010, the label released FRKWYS Vol. 3, an album-length collaboration between Arp and Anthony Moore. Arp reworked both original and unreleased music written by Moore in the 1960s, which was the result of working together at Atlantic Sound's Brooklyn studio in September 2009. FRKWYS Vol. 9 had Los Angeles-based artists Sun Araw and M. Geddes Gengras travel to Jamaica to record with the notable reggae vocal group, The Congos.

Beats in Space series
In 2011, the label began releasing the Beats in Space series of vinyl singles and albums. In 2015, Fact TV presented a documentary on Beats In Space and ranked BIS 25th in their Top 30 album covers of 2015. The BIS Boat Party at Mareh Festival was also a featured pick by Resident Advisor. In 2015 the Beats In Space 15th Anniversary Mix was named compilation of the month by Mixmag. 
In 2016 the first issue of Record Magazine featured an interview with Tim Sweeney. Beats In Space also joined Bandcamp with Tim Sweeney being featured on Bandcamp's radio show.
In 2017 a Beats In Space photo book was featured in Record Magazine.

Freedom to Spend imprint
RVNG Intl partnered with Pete Swanson (formerly of Yellow Swans) in 2017 to relaunch his Freedom To Spend label, along with Portland record store owner Jed Bindeman. The label is described as "concerned with autonomous anomalies produced by musicians working within and outside the limits of technology to create intimate art. By virtue of this, the music of Freedom to Spend resonates across a broad sound spectrum, but thrives without rigid regulation." Freedom To Spend has reissued several overlooked and underheard experimental albums from the past few decades. Freedom To Spend was named one of the best electronic labels of 2017 by The Quietus.

Events
The label has been active in organizing art and music shows, partnering with the likes of the White Columns Gallery in New York City, the Barbican Center in London, and MoMa PS1′s Summer Warm Up series. RVNG worked with the Unsound Festival in Kraków, Poland, and presented a label showcase in April 2014 at Moogfest in Asheville, North Carolina featuring Blondes, Holly Herndon, and Craig Leon performing "NOMMOS" with the Asheville Symphony. Also in 2014 the 15th Anniversary of Beats In Space was celebrated at Corsica Studios in London. In 2018 RVNG featured artists and collaborated with Le Guess Who music festival. RVNG was also featured at MoMA PS1 Come Together Music Festival and Record Fair.

Artists

Current
The following artists are current as of August 2018:

Anna Homler / Breadwoman
The Body
Greg Fox
Helado Negro
Holly Herndon
K. Leimer
Craig Leon
Pauline Anna Strom
Sensations' Fix
Stellar OM Source
Sugai Ken
Visible Cloaks
Oliver Coates
Kate NV 
Lucrecia Dalt 
Mark Renner
Emily A. Sprague
Diatom Deli
Dylan Moon
Isik Kural
Horse Lords
Dialect
Flore Laurentienne
Satomimagae
Ka Baird
Oliver Coates

Alumni

Allez-Allez
Blondes
Bronze (San Francisco band)
CFCF
Clean Plate
Harald Grosskopf
Laurel Halo
Julia Holter
Lauer (Phillip Lauer)
The Congos
David Borden
James Ferraro
Sun Araw
These Are Powers
Daniel Lopatin
Regal Regal
Mirror Mirror
Pink Skull
Gardland
Maxmillion Dunbar
Mikael Seifu

Beats in Space (BIS) artists
The following is a complete list (as of August 2018) of artists who have released music as part of the Beats in Space Records series.
Antenna
Dukes of Chutney
E Ruscha V
Hidden Fees
Jacques Bon
Jee Day
Lauer (Philip Lauer)
Matt Karmil
Mount Liberation Unlimited
Paradis
Palmbomen II
Secret Circuit
Shan
Tornado Wallace
Gonno 
Crystal & S. Koshi 
House of Spirits 
Jaakko Eino Kalevi 
Guido w Georges Perin 
T&P
Shy Layers

FRKWYS series
The following is an incomplete list of artists who have been included in the FRKWYS series:

Excepter
Carter Tutti
JG Thirlwell
Jack Dangers
Arp
Anthony Moore
Psychic Ills
Juan Atkins
Gibby Haynes
Hans-Joachim Irmler
Mirror Mirror
Alig Fodder's Pranayame
Stuart Moxham
Stuart Argabright
Gretchen Faust
Rico Conning
Julianna Barwick
Ikue Mori
Samuel Godin
Blues Control
Laraaji
Sun Araw
M. Geddes Gengras
The Congos
Steve Gunn
Mike Cooper
David Van Tieghem
Diamond Terrifier (Sam Hillmer + Max Alper)
Future Shuttle
Georgia
Helado Negro
Darren Ho
Eli Keszler
Hiro Kone
Megafortress
Blanche Blanche Blanche
Maxmillion Dunbar
Suzanne Ciani
Kaitlyn Aurelia Smith
Alan Howarth 
Harald Grosskopf
Emeralds
David Borden 
James Ferraro 
Samuel Godin
Laurel Halo 
Daniel Lopatin
Robert Aiki Aubrey Lowe
Ariel Kalma

Freedom to Spend series
The following is an incomplete list of artists who have been included in the Freedom to Spend imprint:
Michele Mercure
Marc Barreca
Pep Llopis
Richard Horowitz
Ursula K. Le Guin & Todd Barton
Cheri Knight
Ernest Hood
Universal Liberation Orchestra
Rimbarimba
June Chikuma
Tiziano Popoli

Discography

Main album series

RVNG Prsnts Mxs series

RVNG OF THE NRDS series

FRKWYS Series

Beats in Space series

RERVNG series

Commend See series

Freedom to Spend series

Further reading
Interviews

See also
List of independent record labels

References

External links

American independent record labels
Record labels established in 2004